The Inland Forts are a line of peaks extending between Northwest Mountain and Saint Pauls Mountain, in the Asgard Range of Victoria Land, Antarctica. Taylor Glacier lies to the south. The peaks were discovered and so named by the British National Antarctic Expedition, 1901–04.

Peaks 

 Mattox Bastion
 Sutherland Peak 
 Wolak Peak

References

Further reading
  James G. Bockheim, editor, The Soils of Antarctica, p. 133
 US Antarctic Program Continuation: Environmental Impact Statement, p. 36
 David R. Marchant, George H. Denton, David E. Sugden and Carl C. Swisher, III, Miocene Glacial Stratigraphy and Landscape Evolution of the Western Asgard Range, Antarctica 

Asgard Range
Mountain ranges of Victoria Land
McMurdo Dry Valleys